Ectoedemia vincamajorella is a moth of the family Nepticulidae. It is endemic to central Italy.

The larvae feed on Vinca major.

External links
Fauna Europaea
A provisional phylogenetic check-list of the western Palaearctic Nepticulidae, with data on hostplants (Lepidoptera)

Nepticulidae
Moths of Europe
Endemic fauna of Italy
Moths described in 1964